Marusarz is a Polish surname typical for Goral population of Zakopane region. Notable people include:
 Józef Marusarz (1926-1996), Polish alpine skier
 Stanisław Marusarz (1913-1993), Polish Nordic-combined skier
 Wojciech Marusarz (born 1993), Polish Nordic-combined skier

Polish-language surnames